Ozyorsky District was an administrative and municipal district (raion) in Moscow Oblast, Russia. It was located in the south of the oblast. Its administrative center was the town of Ozyory. Population: 35,752 (2010 Census);  The population of Ozyory accounted for 72.2% of the district's total population.

History
Ozyorsky Municipal District was abolished on March 30, 2015, with its territory reorganized as Ozyory Urban Okrug. Within the framework of administrative divisions, on April 13, 2015 the inhabited localities of the low-level administrative divisions (the rural settlements) were subordinated to the Town of Ozyory, which remained the only subdivision of the administrative district. The administrative district itself was abolished on May 16, 2015, with its territory reorganized as Ozyory Town Under Oblast Jurisdiction.

References

Notes

Sources

Districts of Moscow Oblast
States and territories disestablished in 2015
